Spassk is a town and the administrative center of Spassky District in Penza Oblast, Russia. Population:

History
In 1648, an uncultivated field was discovered in Shatsky Uyezd and was given to a nearby monastery. In 1663, a village was established there, called Bogdanovo. In 1779, it was renamed Spassk and made the seat of an uyezd by a decree of Catherine the Great. However, soon it became apparent that confusion would result since several other towns in Russia shared the name (notably Spassk-Ryazansky) and the town was officially renamed Spassk-na-Studentse. In 1925, a communist party conference in the uyezd resolved that the town be renamed Bednodemyanovsk in honor of the poet Demyan Bedny. Bedny himself never visited the town, but was said to maintain a lively correspondence with its inhabitants. In 2005, the original name of the town was restored, and the district was also renamed.

Administrative and municipal status
Within the framework of administrative divisions, Spassk serves as the administrative center of Spassky District. As an administrative division, it is incorporated within Spassky District as the town of district significance of Spassk. As a municipal division, the town of district significance of Spassk is incorporated within Spassky Municipal District as Spassk Urban Settlement.

References

Notes

Sources

External links
Unofficial website of Spassk 

Cities and towns in Penza Oblast
Spassky Uyezd (Tambov Governorate)
Populated places established in 1663
1663 establishments in Russia